Walton is a settlement in New Zealand. It is sited at the junction of Walton Road and Morrinsville Walton Road, in the Central Waikato Region.

The Walton Golf Club is 2 kilometres from the centre of the village.

Industry 
The area is predominantly dairying with some maize growing and meat chicken farming. A large thoroughbred horse stud also has its base there.

Industry is small consisting mainly of small service industries but there is a large grain drying plant sited next to the railway line.

Railway 
Walton had a flag station on the East Coast Main Trunk, opened from Morrinsville to Tīrau (then called Oxford) on Monday 8 March 1886 by the Thames Valley & Rotorua Railway Co. New Zealand Railways Department took over the line on 1 April 1886. By 1896 a platform, cart approach, loading bank, sheep yards and a passing loop for 21 wagons had been added. The loop had been extended to 38 by 1911 and 65 by 1964.

Walton station closed to passengers on 2 February 1981 and to goods on 29 March 1981, except private siding traffic and was closed completely on Monday 3 November 1986. There is now only a single track through the station site. There are passing loops at Kereone,  to the north and at Hemopo  to the east.

Geography 

To the east of Walton is the community of Wardville.

Demographics 
The SA1 area is part of the larger Richmond Downs-Wardville statistical area.

The SA1 area had a population of 192 at the 2018 New Zealand census, unchanged since the 2013 census, and a decrease of 21 people (−9.9%) since the 2006 census. There were 75 households, comprising 105 males and 84 females, giving a sex ratio of 1.25 males per female. The median age was 35.8 years (compared with 37.4 years nationally), with 42 people (21.9%) aged under 15 years, 36 (18.8%) aged 15 to 29, 93 (48.4%) aged 30 to 64, and 18 (9.4%) aged 65 or older.

Ethnicities were 90.6% European/Pākehā, 9.4% Māori, and 6.2% Asian. People may identify with more than one ethnicity.

Although some people chose not to answer the census's question about religious affiliation, 59.4% had no religion, 35.9% were Christian and 1.6% had other religions.

Of those at least 15 years old, 24 (16.0%) people had a bachelor's or higher degree, and 30 (20.0%) people had no formal qualifications. The median income was $48,000, compared with $31,800 nationally. 39 people (26.0%) earned over $70,000 compared to 17.2% nationally. The employment status of those at least 15 was that 96 (64.0%) people were employed full-time, 21 (14.0%) were part-time, and 6 (4.0%) were unemployed.

In 1916, Walton had a population of 320

In 2013, the population was 129, and this is expected to be stable through to 2045.

Richmond Downs-Wardville statistical area

Richmond Downs-Wardville had a population of 1,278 at the 2018 New Zealand census, an increase of 57 people (4.7%) since the 2013 census, and a decrease of 33 people (−2.5%) since the 2006 census. There were 468 households, comprising 663 males and 615 females, giving a sex ratio of 1.08 males per female. The median age was 34.4 years (compared with 37.4 years nationally), with 273 people (21.4%) aged under 15 years, 273 (21.4%) aged 15 to 29, 585 (45.8%) aged 30 to 64, and 147 (11.5%) aged 65 or older.

Ethnicities were 83.8% European/Pākehā, 15.7% Māori, 1.2% Pacific peoples, 4.5% Asian, and 0.7% other ethnicities. People may identify with more than one ethnicity.

The percentage of people born overseas was 13.6, compared with 27.1% nationally.

Although some people chose not to answer the census's question about religious affiliation, 49.3% had no religion, 39.7% were Christian, 0.2% were Hindu, 0.2% were Buddhist and 0.9% had other religions.

Of those at least 15 years old, 156 (15.5%) people had a bachelor's or higher degree, and 207 (20.6%) people had no formal qualifications. The median income was $40,200, compared with $31,800 nationally. 204 people (20.3%) earned over $70,000 compared to 17.2% nationally. The employment status of those at least 15 was that 558 (55.5%) people were employed full-time, 201 (20.0%) were part-time, and 39 (3.9%) were unemployed.

Education

The school has existed since 1896.

Notable people 

 Judith Collins National Party politician
 Sue Moroney Labour Party politician

References

Populated places in Waikato
Matamata-Piako District